Rivertown may refer to: 

 a town on a river
 Peter Hessler's book from 2001 about Fuling at the Yangtse in China, Sichuan
 Rivertown, a neighbourhood on the Detroit International Riverfront in Detroit, Michigan, USA 
 Rivertown, Georgia, an unincorporated community
 Rivertown, a themed area at Dreamworld amusement park in Gold Coast, Australia
 Rivertown, an area of Kings Island amusement park in Mason, Ohio, USA
 Rivertown Junction, a themed area at Dollywood amusement park in Pigeon Forge, Tennessee, USA
 RiverTown Crossings, a shopping mall in Grandville, Michigan, USA
 Rivertown, a neighborhood in Kenner, Louisiana, USA
 Rivertown Newspaper Group, a publisher of newspapers in Wisconsin
 "Rivertown", a song from the Fascination (album) album by The Greencards
 Wharf at Rivertown in Chester, Pennsylvania, USA
 Lofts at Rivertown, the current name for the Frederick Stearns Building
 Rivertown Beer, brewed at Hertford since 2017.

See also
 Riverton (disambiguation)
 Town River